The Journal of Oil Palm Research (formerly known as Elaeis: The International Journal of Oil Palm Research and Development) is a quarterly peer-reviewed open-access scientific journal covering research on palm oil fats, oils, and oleo-chemistry. It is published by the Malaysian Palm Oil Board and the editor-in-chief is Dr. Ahmad Parveez Ghulam Kadir (Malaysian Palm Oil Board). According to the Journal Citation Reports, the journal has a 1.564 impact factor for 2019.

See also
Augustine Ong, founding editor-in-chief, Elaeis

References

External links
Official Website
Sea Oil Website

English-language journals
Biotechnology journals
Oil palm
Open access journals
Quarterly journals
Biochemistry journals
Publications established in 1989
Botany journals